Bracquemond is a surname. Notable people with the surname include:

 Félix Bracquemond (1833–1914), French painter and etcher, husband of Marie
 Marie Bracquemond (1840–1916), French Impressionist painter

French-language surnames